Jeremy Robert Patrick Curl is an Anglo-Irish explorer, writer, filmmaker and photographer.

Biography
Curl was born in Tokyo to English and Irish parents and educated at Charterhouse in Surrey, where he won an art scholarship and subsequently attended the University of Utrecht and Lund University, where he read History.

Curl worked briefly at the British Museum, London, in the Ancient Egyptology department alongside renowned Egyptologist Vivien Davies where he learnt to read Egyptian hieroglyphs and awakened his love for ancient and enigmatic cultures. He has travelled widely in Africa and Asia and has worked with statesmen and artists alike, from being photographer to Cuban laureate Pablo Armando Fernández to filmmaker to the President of Latvia. While in Cuba he interviewed the Castro family about Cuba's political future. Curl has exhibited his expedition photographs widely, including alongside Nelson Mandela in 2010. In 2013 he was presented with an award for excellence in travel by Crown Prince Hamdan bin Mohammed Al Maktoum of Dubai.

Saharan exploration
In 2008 he became the first non-African to cross the Tanezrouft area of the Sahara without motorized transport During his time in the desert he lived with the Touareg nomads, travelling with the tribes of the Kel Ahaggar and Kel Ifoghas, witnessing their threatened lifestyle first hand. He has published articles about his findings and experiences and written a basic dictionary of Tamasheq, the language of the Touareg. He was nominated for a Rolex Award for Exploration and Discovery in 2009.

Transnistria
In 2009 Curl spent time in Transnistria, officially the Pridnestrovian Moldovan Republic, a Leninist post-Soviet frozen conflict zone between the Ukraine and Moldova. A socialist state that borrows from the Soviet model, Transnistria is a police state of 400,000 inhabitants. Although unrecognised as a sovereign nation by any UN country, Transnistria produces its own passports, currency and stamps and runs its own police force and army. Curl returned having photographed scenes previously unseen outside the republic.

Lower Omo River Valley
In 2010, Curl crossed the western side of the Omo River Valley in southwest Ethiopia from Dima across tribal lands southwards towards Kenya. He passed through the western Surma tribal lands, through the lands of the Bench, Dizi and Nyangatom tribes finishing on the eastern side of the Omo in the lands of the Hamer. Curl travelled with tribal escorts and scouts, changing companions from tribe to tribe, most of whom are cut off from outside influence and still continue a very traditional way of life. Curl encountered people who had never seen white men and is one of a handful of Westerners to travel across this land on foot where tribal conflict is frequent.

East Africa
2010 saw Curl travel with the Rendille tribe in northern Kenya, using camels to cross the Kaisut Plain, the Ndoto Mountains and the Karoli desert. There he encountered the people of the Pokot, Samburu, Gabra and Turkana tribes. Later in the year, Curl with anthropologist Luke Glowacki from Harvard University carried out an expedition across the Danakil Depression, a volcanic desert in Ethiopia often called 'the cruellest place on Earth' and home to the Afar people. It is the hottest place on Earth, with temperatures in the Danakil have been known to pass 60 degrees Celsius. Curl and Glowacki walked the ridge of volcanoes southwards, using camels to transport their water and provisions.

Other interests
As a film director Curl has won the Horror Film Festival, the Netherlands (2002). He is also a published cryptographer having contributed to academic journals internationally including the journal Eidos. Curl is a keen landscape painter.

Books
Amongst the Touareg (Brendan, 2009)
How to Get to the North Pole: . . . and Other Iconic Adventures by Tim Moss, contributor (How To Books, 2012)

References

External links
Official website
New Internationalist Magazine
Rice n Peas Films

1982 births
Living people
Irish explorers
People educated at Charterhouse School
British explorers
Lund University alumni
Utrecht University alumni
British filmmakers
Fellows of the Royal Geographical Society